Baiveriyaa is Maldivian romantic drama television series directed by Mohamed Shareef. Developed by Television Maldives in association with UNFPA, it stars Yoosuf Shafeeu, Niuma Mohamed, Khadheeja Ibrahim Didi, Ali Seezan and Aminath Rishfa in main roles.

Cast and characters

Main
 Yoosuf Shafeeu as Adheel
 Niuma Mohamed as Nuzha
 Adam Naseer as Zahid
 Aminath Rasheedha as Fareedha
 Aminath Rishfa as Yumna
 Ali Seezan as Rayaan
 Ibrahim Rasheed as Husnee
 Hussain Nooradeen as Badhuru
 Fauziyya Hassan as Nazeera
 Zuleikha Abdul Latheef as Ramla
 Khadheeja Ibrahim Didi as Leena
 Aminath Shareef as Shifana

Recurring
 Hassan Afeef as Badheeu
 Husnee Ahmed as Arif
 Abdulla Muaz as Naseeh
 Nashidha Mohamed as Zulfa
 Mariyam Zuhura as Rishfa
 Hamid Ali as Amir
 Shimla Mahir as Zumra

Guest
 Hamdhan Farooq as gym member (Episode 1)
 Azim as doctor (Episode 3)
 Mohamed Faisal as Yasir (Episode 10)
 Satthar Ibrahim Manik as Rayaan's father (Episode 10)
 Arifa Ibrahim as Faheema's friend (Episode 10)
 Moosa Zakariyya as Nuzuha's stalker (Episode 11)

Episodes

Soundtrack

Response
Upon release, the series received mainly positive reviews from critics and audience, where the writing, direction and performance of the actors were highlighted.

References

Serial drama television series
Maldivian television shows